Nikkita Persaud (born 8 April 1990) is a Canadian-born Guyanese footballer who plays as a defender. She has been a member and captain of the Guyana women's national team.

International career
Persaud capped for Guyana at senior level during the 2018 CFU Women's Challenge Series.

See also
List of Guyana women's international footballers

References

External links

League1 Ontario profile

1990 births
Living people
Citizens of Guyana through descent
Guyanese women's footballers
Women's association football forwards
Women's association football midfielders
The Citadel Bulldogs women's soccer players
Rhode Island Rams women's soccer players
Guyana women's international footballers
Guyanese expatriate footballers
Guyanese expatriate sportspeople in the United States
Expatriate women's soccer players in the United States
Indo-Guyanese people
People from Ajax, Ontario
Soccer people from Ontario
Canadian women's soccer players
Canadian expatriate women's soccer players
Canadian expatriate sportspeople in the United States
Canadian sportspeople of Guyanese descent
Canadian people of Indo-Guyanese descent
Pickering FC (women) players
League1 Ontario (women) players